A redox indicator (also called an oxidation-reduction indicator) is an indicator which undergoes a definite color change at a specific electrode potential.

The requirement for fast and reversible color change means that the oxidation-reduction equilibrium for an indicator redox system needs to be established very quickly. Therefore, only a few classes of organic redox systems can be used for indicator purposes.

There are two common classes of redox indicators:
 metal complexes of phenanthroline and bipyridine.  In these systems, the metal changes oxidation state.
 organic redox systems such as methylene blue.  In these systems, a proton  participant in the redox reaction. Therefore, sometimes redox indicators are also divided into two general groups: independent or dependent on pH.

The most common redox indicator are organic compounds.
Redox Indicator example:
The molecule 2,2'- Bipyridine is a redox Indicator. In solution, it changes from light blue to red at an electrode potential of 0.97 V.

pH independent

pH dependent

See also
Chemical analysis
pH indicator
Complexometric indicator

References

External links
Redox Indicators. Characteristics And Applications

Redox indicators
Physical chemistry